Colonel Sir Charles Seely, 1st Baronet KGStJ, DL (11 August 1833 – 16 April 1915) was a British industrialist and politician.

Seely was Liberal Party Member of Parliament (MP) for Nottingham from 1869 to 1874 and 1880 to 1885, and for Nottingham West from 1885 to 1886, and Liberal Unionist MP for Nottingham West from 1892 to 1895.  He was an industrialist and major landowner on the Isle of Wight and in Nottinghamshire.  He was also a noted philanthropist.  In October 1895 he was the 1st person to be presented with the honorary Freedom of the City of Nottingham, for "Eminent services and noble generosity towards the philanthropic institutions of the City."  He was made a baronet on 19 February 1896.

He lived at Langford Hall and then Sherwood Lodge in Nottinghamshire, Brooke House on the Isle of Wight, and No.1 Carlton House Terrace in London.  He also built Brook Hill House where J. B. Priestley, the famous author and playwright, later lived from 1948.  He was a Deputy Lieutenant of Nottinghamshire, and High Sheriff of Nottinghamshire.  He was the Colonel of the 1st Nottinghamshire (Robin Hood) Rifle Volunteers.  He was Vice-Chairman of the first Nottinghamshire County Council.  He was also a Knight of Grace Order of St John of Jerusalem. 
Seely was a member of a family of politicians, industrialists and significant landowners. His father Charles Seely (1803–1887) was a member of parliament and one of the wealthiest industrialists of the Victorian era. Sir Charles and his eldest son Sir Charles Seely, 2nd Baronet, youngest son John Edward Bernard Seely, 1st Baron Mottistone, and grandson Sir Hugh Seely, 3rd Baronet and 1st Baron Sherwood were also all members of parliament.  His grandson, David Peter Seely, 4th Baron Mottistone, was the last Governor of the Isle of Wight; he was baptised with Winston Churchill and the then Duke of Cornwall (subsequently King Edward VIII, and then later Duke of Windsor) as his godparents. David Peter Seely, 4th Baron Mottistone's son Peter John Philip Seely, 5th Baron Mottistone (1949–2013) was a godson of Queen Elizabeth II's husband Prince Philip, Duke of Edinburgh. His great-great-grandson, Bob Seely, is the current Member of Parliament for the Isle of Wight.

Wife and some descendants

He married Emily Evans (died 1894), sister of the businessman and politician Sir Francis Evans, 1st Baronet, on 11 August 1857. He is a great-grandfather, via her mother Leila Emily Seely, of Rachel Douglas-Home, 27th Baroness Dacre a descendant of Charles II of England, who married William Douglas-Home younger brother of the Prime Minister and 14th Earl Sir Alec Douglas-Home.  He is the great-great grandfather of George William Beaumont Howard, the current and 13th Earl of Carlisle whose principal family seat was Castle Howard. His son Lt-Col Frank Evelyn Seely married Leila Eliza Russell, great-granddaughter of John Russell, 6th Duke of Bedford and granddaughter of Lord Charles James Fox Russell whose half brother was Prime Minister John Russell, 1st Earl Russell.  Their son Major Frank James Wriothesley Seely (1901–1956), married (1925) Vera Lilian Margaret Birkin (1903–1970), a granddaughter of Sir Thomas Isaac Birkin, 1st Bt. (1831–1922), whose great granddaughter is Jane Birkin (b. 1946), actress, partner of Serge Gainsbourg in the 1970s and namesake of the Hermès Birkin bag. The Michael Seely Memorial Stakes held at York was named in honour of their eldest son, the racing correspondent. He is also the great-great-grandfather of Bob Seely, the current Member of Parliament for the Isle of Wight.

Seely is a third great-grandfather, via his youngest son, John Edward Bernard Seely, 1st Baron Mottistone, of theatre director Sophie Hunter who married actor Benedict Cumberbatch 
on 14 February 2015, at the 12th century St. Peter and St. Paul's Church, Mottistone on the Isle of Wight followed by a reception at Mottistone Manor.

Wealth at death
When he died in 1915 he left estate of £1,052,070 (equivalent to £641 million (in 2014), or £75 million (in 2015), obtained by multiplying £1,052,070.00 by the percentage increase in the RPI since 1915), as measured by share of UK GDP, UK CPI), which was according to The Times, the second largest estate that year (by comparison the estate of Nathan Mayer Rothschild, 1st Baron Rothschild was the largest valued at £2,500,000) and made him one of the wealthiest men in Britain.

External links and sources
Burke's Peerage and Baronetage 107th Edition Volume III *Seely Baronets
Seely family crest
The Great Houses of Nottinghamshire, Sherwood Lodge (1881)
Seely estates listed at UK National Registry of Archives
University of London and History of Parliament Trust &
Link to St Paul's Church built by Sir Charles Seely Bt in 1896 and monument to his wife Emily Seely designed by Sir Thomas Brock.
Art collection included Cicero's Villa by J. M. W. Turner, see: and paintings of Venice by Myles Birket Foster commissioned by his father-
Wight Life April/May 1975 article on The Seely Family and their Island Homes
John Edward Bernard Seely, 1st Baron Mottistone, Dictionary of National Biography, 1941–1950
The Times Obituary 1915, Wills and Bequests.
 Economic power measured by wealth as compared to the size of the economy (List of most wealthy historical figures), which is measured by share of GDP. Data from Measuring Worth:
Occupants of No.1 Carlton House Terrace

Notes

External links 
 

1833 births
1915 deaths
Baronets in the Baronetage of the United Kingdom
British philanthropists
British real estate businesspeople
High Sheriffs of Nottinghamshire
Liberal Party (UK) MPs for English constituencies
Liberal Unionist Party MPs for English constituencies
Knights of Grace of the Order of St John
Politicians from Nottingham
UK MPs 1868–1874
UK MPs 1880–1885
UK MPs 1885–1886
UK MPs 1892–1895
Charles, 1st Baronet
People from Newark and Sherwood (district)
19th-century English businesspeople